Božidarka Frajt (also spelled Frait; born 11 November 1940) is a Croatian actress. 

In her six decade long career, she has composed a prolific repertoire in Croatian television, film and theatre, but is best known for her role in cinéma vérité-style 1972 film The Living Truth, which earned her critical praise and a Golden Arena Award for Best Actress. In 2010, Frajt was awarded the Vladimir Nazor Award for lifetime achievement.

Early life
Božidarka Frajt was born Božidarka Grublješić on 11 November 1940. Born to an ethnic Bosnian Serb family, her exact birthplace is unknown due to the scarce information of her childhood. It is believed she was born in Velika Žuljevica under Kozara, and that she was taken to a concentration camp for Serbian kids in Sisak during the Kozara Offensive in 1942 along with thousands of other orphans. She was later adopted by Croatian Jews Katarina and Stjepan Frajt. At the age of 36, she found out about her Kozara heritage when a woman named Dara Grublješić identified her as her niece.

Career
Frajt made her acting debut in the 1959 Croatian-language film Lakat kao takav, directed by Ante Babaja. In 1963, Frajt interpreted the complex character Vera in the Yugoslav political film Licem u lice. The film directed by Branko Bauer gained critical acclaim, winning a Big Golden Arena Award for Best Film at the Pula Film Festival and critical praise.

Her debut as a television actress came with the 1969 Sumorna Jesen, as "The Good Fairy". The plot lines of most of the episodes Frajt starred in were inspired by the experiences of screenwriter Ivan Šibl in World War II.

In 1972, Frajt starred in the directorial debut film of Tomislav Radić The Living Truth. Her dynamic and dominant interpretation in the drama provided a direct dichotomy to the depressing nature of the film. Her performance instantly made her one of the most prominent film actresses of Yugoslavia, winning her a Golden Arena for Best Actress and commercial success. In a 1999 poll among 44 Croatian film consumers, The Living Truth was placed 20th on the list of all-time best Croatian films.

Frajt had a major role in the 1977 Krešo Golik film Pucanj, sharing the protagonist role with Serbian actor Marko Nikolić. In 1978, she appeared as the middle-aged audio pedagogue protagonist Ljubica in another Golik production Ljubica.

In 1981, Veljko Bulajić invited her to play the principal character in the film High Voltage, after her performance as Ljubica.

In 1997, she voiced Grga (Melvin)'s mother in the Croatian-language animated feature Lapitch the Little Shoemaker. Frajt also dubbed Kala in the official 2005 Croatian version of the 1999 animated film Tarzan, and in 2013, Helen Mirren's character Dean Abigail Hardscrabble in the Croatian dub of Monsters University.

For her services to Yugoslav film, she was awarded the Vladimir Nazor Award in 2010.

Personal life

Frajt was married to Croatian producer Boris Gregorić, with whom she had one child, Bojana, who is a prominent Croatian actress. Frajt currently lives in Zagreb.

Selected filmography

Television

Film

References

External links 
 

1940 births
Living people
People from Novi Grad, Bosnia and Herzegovina
Serbs of Bosnia and Herzegovina
Croatian actresses
Croatian film actresses
Croatian television actresses
Croatian voice actresses
Croatian stage actresses
Croatian Theatre Award winners
Croatian theatre directors
Vladimir Nazor Award winners
Golden Arena winners
Croatian people of Serbian descent